Melese Feissa (born 8 December 1967) is a retired Ethiopian runner who specialized in cross-country running.

Achievements

References

1967 births
Living people
Ethiopian male long-distance runners
Ethiopian male cross country runners
20th-century Ethiopian people